The Höftsee is a lake in the Holstein Switzerland in North Germany.
It lies on the River Schwentine east of the town of Plön between the Behler See and the Großer Plöner See.

There is a watermill on the Höftsee that makes use of the drop between the Höftsee and the Großer Plöner See.
The associated weir is impassable to boats. There is however a boat slide that considerably eases the transportation of boats over land.

External links
 Fünf-Seen-Fahrt cruises  

Lakes of Schleswig-Holstein
LHoftsee